Erich Goldmann (born April 7, 1976) is a German former professional ice hockey defenceman. Goldmann was drafted by the Ottawa Senators in the 8th round (212th overall) in the 1996 NHL Entry Draft. He played one game in the National Hockey League for the team against the Nashville Predators. He did not register a point in his 9:44 of ice time. Most of his professional career was spent in the Deutsche Eishockey Liga, most recently for the Iserlohn Roosters. He ended his playing career in the 2nd Bundesliga with a single season at EHC München.

Goldmann played 126 international games for the German national team, including the 1998 and 2002 Winter Olympics. On 28 May 2011 he was inducted into the German Ice Hockey Hall of Fame. Goldmann currently works as the main ice hockey pundit for German TV channel Sport1.

Career statistics

Regular season and playoffs

International

See also
List of players who played only one game in the NHL

External links
 

1976 births
Living people
Adler Mannheim players
Cincinnati Cyclones (IHL) players
Cincinnati Mighty Ducks players
Dayton Bombers players
Detroit Vipers players
ERC Ingolstadt players
Essen Mosquitoes players
EV Landshut players
German ice hockey defencemen
Grand Rapids Griffins (IHL) players
Hershey Bears players
Ice hockey players at the 1998 Winter Olympics
Ice hockey players at the 2002 Winter Olympics
Iserlohn Roosters players
Kaufbeurer Adler players
Olympic ice hockey players of Germany
Ottawa Senators draft picks
Ottawa Senators players
People from Dingolfing-Landau
Sportspeople from Lower Bavaria
Worcester IceCats players